Gander Mountain, later known as Gander Outdoors and Gander RV, headquartered in St. Paul, Minnesota, was a retail network of stores for hunting, fishing, camping, and other outdoor recreation products and services.

History
Gander Mountain Incorporated began as a catalog-based in Wilmot, Wisconsin. Wilmot is located near Gander Mountain, the highest point in Lake County, Illinois a short distance across the state line.  the chain had 162 stores in 27 states, making it the largest chain of outdoors specialty stores in the United States.

In the 1990s the company sought bankruptcy protection and began to rebuild its business once it emerged. In 1996 it sold its mail order division and then later acquired the watersports company Overton's in order to relaunch its mail order business.

The company filed for bankruptcy in March 2017 with plans to close 32 stores. On April 28, 2017, Camping World Holdings was announced as the winner of the bankruptcy auction of Gander Mountain.  On May 5, 2017, Gander Mountain announced via its website the upcoming closure of all of its locations. The new owner, Marcus Lemonis, has clarified through his account on Twitter that the bankruptcy court has sold the inventory and is liquidating it. Not all stores will remain closed if a new lease can be worked out with each landlord.  On January 4, 2018, Camping World announced an official list of stores that will reopen under the new Gander Outdoors branding, where 69 stores will open.

From 2019 to 2020, Gander Outdoors replaced its parent company Camping World as the title sponsor of NASCAR's Truck Series.

Management 

Gander Mountain was formerly traded on NASDAQ but was turned into a private company under the majority ownership of David Pratt and the Erickson family, which own Holiday gas stations.

David C. Pratt was elected chairman of the board in December 2006. Pratt was elected as a director of Gander Mountain in August 2005 and named vice chairman of the board in December 2005.  The chief executive officer is Jay Tibbets.

Operations 

Gander Mountain offered a wide array of sportswear for men, women, and children, camouflage and field wear, kayaks and canoes.

Gander Mountain sold its mail order business to Cabela's in 1996 with a no-compete clause. In 2007 it won a lawsuit brought by Cabela's to resume online sales. On December 6, 2007, the company announced it purchased boating and watersports catalog company Overton's for $70 million from a private-equity firm. The purchase of Overton's, based in Greenville, North Carolina, helped Gander Mountain's transition back into direct marketing.

In December 2013 Gander Mountain brought suit against Cabela's claiming that the competitor was illegally using domain names related to its business. The lawsuit accuses Cabela's of "violating federal and state statutes as well as common law." Additionally Gander Mountain claims that Cabela's is in violation of the federal Anticybersquatting Consumer Protection Act, trademark infringement and trademark dilution.

Locations 

The new Gander Outdoors will open with 69 stores in 22 states. Gander Mountain's "large-format" stores ranged in size from 50,000 to 120,000 square feet and offered customers a unique experience. Physically, and visually, the stores had wider shopping aisles, high-joist ceilings, brick and stone accents, log-wrapped columns, and other wilderness related decorations.

Gander Mountain online store officially opened in August 2008.

Gun sales 
Gander Mountain called itself the top seller of new and used firearms in the United States. Starting in 2010, it had opened six Gander Mountain Academy and Firearms Supercenters, originally called “gun world”, where it estimates that over 250,000 people had received training.

Bankruptcy
In March 2017, Gander Mountain voluntarily filed for Chapter 11 bankruptcy. The retail chain decided to close 32 underperforming stores in 11 states. The company also began looking for a buyer. However, there was initially little to no interest from potential buyers. Store closures began in April with the affected stores holding inventory liquidation sales.

Sale to Camping World
On May 1, 2017, Camping World Holdings, Inc., acquired Gander Mountain at auction for an estimated $35.4 million. The sale will be finalized pending approval by federal bankruptcy court. As part of the deal, Camping World is obligated to operate a minimum of 17 Gander Mountain stores. However, Camping World executives have stated that they will most likely retain and operate stores in excess of that number. Liquidation sales will continue in order to revamp Gander Mountain's inventory structure with one that ensures greater profitability. The revamp will include incorporating Camping World merchandise at select Gander Mountain locations.

See also
 Academy Sports + Outdoors
 Bass Pro Shops
 Cabela's
 Camping World
 Dick's Sporting Goods
 Good Sam Enterprises
 Green Top Sporting Goods
 Legendary Whitetails
 REI
 Scheels All Sports
 Sportsman's Warehouse

References

External links
 
 Overton's

Companies based in Saint Paul, Minnesota
Economy of the Eastern United States
Economy of the Midwestern United States
Economy of the Southwestern United States
Sporting goods retailers of the United States
Retail companies established in 1960
1960 establishments in Wisconsin
Defunct companies based in Minnesota
Defunct companies based in Wisconsin
Defunct retail companies of the United States
Privately held companies based in Minnesota
Firearm commerce
Retail companies disestablished in 2017
Companies that filed for Chapter 11 bankruptcy in 1996
Companies that filed for Chapter 11 bankruptcy in 2017